Emamzadeh Mahmud (also Romanized as Emāmzādeh Maḩmūd) is a village in Larim Rural District, Gil Khuran District, Juybar County, Mazandaran Province, Iran at the coast of the Caspian sea. At the 2006 census, its population was 146, in 36 families.

References 

Populated places in Juybar County